Wheelchair fencing at the 2016 Summer Paralympics was held in Rio from 4 September to 8 September 2016.

Classification
Fencers are given a classification depending on the type and extent of their disability. The classification system allows fencers to compete against others with a similar level of function. Fencing has two ability classes, A and B, two genders and three weapons, epee, foil and sabre. Wheelchairs were anchored to the ground during competition.

Medal summary

Medal table

Events

Twelve events will be competed at the games, six for individual men plus a team events, four for women (who do not take part in an individual sabre event) and a team event.

Men's events

Women's events

References

 
2016
Paralympics
2016 Summer Paralympics events
International fencing competitions hosted by Brazil